Mukesh Wadhumal "Micky" Jagtiani (born 15 August 1952) is an Indian billionaire businessman, based in the UAE, and is the chairman and owner of the Dubai based Landmark Group.

Early life and education
Jagtiani is of Sindhi heritage.
He did his schooling in Chennai, Mumbai and Beirut, before moving to London, where he joined an accounting school from which he eventually dropped out.

Career
Jagtiani returned to Bahrain and took over his deceased brother's shop that he turned into a baby products shop (Babyshop). After 10 years working in the shop, Jagtiani started to expand by opening 6 new shops. When the Gulf War struck, he moved to Dubai where he founded the Landmark Group. Over the years, the Landmark Group expanded into fashion, electronics, furniture and budget hotels in Middle East and Southeast Asia. It employs around 45000+ people and has more than 1000 stores across the Persian Gulf region, Middle East and India.

In 2008, Jagtiani bought a 6% stake in the UK high-street retailer Debenhams, and entered the Forbes list of billionaires, and the 16th richest Indian with a net worth of USD 2 billion. In 2014, he launched his family office with assets worth $5 billion. In May 2021, he had a net worth of US$3.0 billion, according to Forbes.

Personal life
He is married, with three children, and lives in Dubai, United Arab Emirates.

References

Businesspeople from Dubai
Businesspeople of Indian descent
Sindhi people
Retailing in Dubai
1952 births
Living people
Indian expatriates in the United Arab Emirates
People from Dubai
People from Kuwait City
Indian expatriates in Kuwait